The Red Head (French: Poil de carotte) is a 1925 French silent drama film directed by Julien Duvivier and starring Henry Krauss, Charlotte Barbier-Krauss and André Heuzé. Duvivier remade it as a sound film of the same name in 1932.

Cast
 Henry Krauss as Monsieur Lepic  
 Charlotte Barbier-Krauss as Madame Lepic  
 André Heuzé as François Lepic, dit Poil de carotte  
 Fabien Haziza as Felix  
 Renée Jean as Ernestine 
 Lydia Zaréna as Annette  
 Suzanne Talba as Maria 
 Yvette Langlais as Mathilde  
 Nora Sylvère

References

Bibliography 
 Crisp, Colin. French Cinema—A Critical Filmography: Volume 1, 1929–1939. Indiana University Press, 2015.

External links 
 

1925 films
French silent feature films
1920s French-language films
Films directed by Julien Duvivier
Films based on French novels
French black-and-white films
French drama films
1925 drama films
Silent drama films
1920s French films